Lydnevi is a fictional North Slavic language created in 2002 by the Czech linguist Libor Sztemon.

Example 
Otec navo,
Jaš jési na nebesai,
Da jest posvetyn tavo nam.
Da jest prihedyn tavo kralestvo.
Da jest stanyn tavo vilja, jako na nébe, tako y na zéma.
As navo bréd e keždanyn davat i nave danas.
Ø adpoštat i nave as navo dluhem jako y me adpoštalesom i navo dluhare.
Ø nevøvedat as nave vø pokušenje, ale nesvabodat as nave é zølyn.
Navad tavo jest kralestvo y moc y slava navéke.
Amén.

References

Artistic languages
Constructed languages introduced in the 2000s
2002 introductions